Pleonasm is redundancy in linguistic expression, such as "black darkness" or "burning fire". It is a manifestation of tautology by traditional rhetorical criteria and might be considered a fault of style. Pleonasm may also be used for emphasis, or because the phrase has become established in a certain form. Tautology and pleonasm are not consistently differentiated in literature.

Usage
Most often, pleonasm is understood to mean a word or phrase which is useless, clichéd, or repetitive, but a pleonasm can also be simply an unremarkable use of idiom. It can aid in achieving a specific linguistic effect, be it social, poetic or literary. Pleonasm sometimes serves the same function as rhetorical repetition—it can be used to reinforce an idea, contention or question, rendering writing clearer and easier to understand. Pleonasm can serve as a redundancy check; if a word is unknown, misunderstood, misheard, or if the medium of communication is poor—a wireless telephone connection or sloppy handwriting—pleonastic phrases can help ensure that the meaning is communicated even if some of the words are lost.

Idiomatic expressions
Some pleonastic phrases are part of a language's idiom, like tuna fish and safe haven in American English. They are so common that their use is unremarkable and often even unnoticeable for native speakers, although in many cases the redundancy can be dropped with no loss of meaning.

When expressing possibility, English speakers often use potentially pleonastic expressions such as It might be possible or perhaps it's possible, where both terms (verb might or adverb perhaps along with the adjective possible) have the same meaning under certain constructions. Many speakers of English use such expressions for possibility in general, such that most instances of such expressions by those speakers are in fact pleonastic. Others, however, use this expression only to indicate a distinction between ontological possibility and epistemic possibility, as in "Both the ontological possibility of X under current conditions and the ontological impossibility of X under current conditions are epistemically possible" (in logical terms, "I am not aware of any facts inconsistent with the truth of proposition X, but I am likewise not aware of any facts inconsistent with the truth of the negation of X"). The habitual use of the double construction to indicate possibility per se is far less widespread among speakers of most other languages (except in Spanish; see examples); rather, almost all speakers of those languages use one term in a single expression:
 French: Il est possible or il peut arriver.
 Romanian: Este posibil or se poate întâmpla.
 Typical Spanish pleonasms
 Voy a subir arriba – I am going to go up upstairs, "arriba" not being necessary.
 Entra adentro – enter inside, "adentro" not being necessary.
 Turkish has many pleonastic constructs because certain verbs necessitate objects:
 yemek yemek – to eat food.
 yazı yazmak – to write writing.
 dışarı çıkmak – to exit outside.
 içeri girmek – to enter inside.
 oyun oynamak – to play a game.

In a satellite-framed language like English, verb phrases containing particles that denote direction of motion are so frequent that even when such a particle is pleonastic, it seems natural to include it (e.g. "enter into").

Professional and scholarly use
Some pleonastic phrases, when used in professional or scholarly writing, may reflect a standardized usage that has evolved or a meaning familiar to specialists but not necessarily to those outside that discipline. Such examples as "null and void", "terms and conditions", "each and every" are legal doublets that are part of legally operative language that is often drafted into legal documents. A classic example of such usage was that by the Lord Chancellor at the time (1864), Lord Westbury, in the English case of  Gorely, when he described a phrase in an Act as "redundant and pleonastic". This type of usage may be favored in certain contexts. However, it may also be disfavored when used gratuitously to portray false erudition, obfuscate, or otherwise introduce verbiage, especially in disciplines where imprecision may introduce ambiguities (such as the natural sciences).

Of the aforementioned phrases, "terms and conditions" may not be pleonastic in some legal systems, as they refer not to a set provisions forming part of a contract, but rather to the specific terms conditioning the effect of the contract or a contractual provision to a future event. In these cases, terms and conditions imply respectively the certainty or uncertainty of said event (e.g., in Brazilian law, a testament has the initial term for coming into force the death of the testator, while a health insurance has the condition of the insured suffering a or one of a set of certain injuries from a or one of a set of certain causes).

Stylistic preference
In addition, pleonasms can serve purposes external to meaning. For example, a speaker who is too terse is often interpreted as lacking ease or grace, because, in oral and sign language, sentences are spontaneously created without the benefit of editing. The restriction on the ability to plan often creates much redundancy. In written language, removing words not strictly necessary sometimes makes writing seem stilted or awkward, especially if the words are cut from an idiomatic expression.

On the other hand, as is the case with any literary or rhetorical effect, excessive use of pleonasm weakens writing and speech; words distract from the content. Writers who want to obfuscate a certain thought may obscure their meaning with excess verbiage. William Strunk Jr. advocated concision in The Elements of Style (1918):

Literary uses

Examples from Baroque, Mannerist, and Victorian provide a counterpoint to Strunk's advocacy of concise writing:
 "This was the most unkindest cut of all." —William Shakespeare, Julius Caesar (Act 3, Scene 2, 183)
 "I will be brief: your noble son is mad:/Mad call I it; for, to define true madness,/What is't but to be nothing else but mad?" — Hamlet (Act 2, Scene 2)
 "Let me tell you this, when social workers offer you, free, gratis and for nothing, something to hinder you from swooning, which with them is an obsession, it is useless to recoil ..." —Samuel Beckett, Molloy

Types

There are various kinds of pleonasm, including bilingual tautological expressions, syntactic pleonasm, semantic pleonasm and morphological pleonasm:

Bilingual tautological expressions
A bilingual tautological expression is a phrase that combines words that mean the same thing in two different languages. An example of a bilingual tautological expression is the Yiddish expression  mayim akhroynem vaser. It literally means "water last water" and refers to "water for washing the hands after meal, grace water". Its first element, mayim, derives from the Hebrew  ['majim] "water". Its second element, vaser, derives from the German Wasser "water".

According to Ghil'ad Zuckermann, Yiddish abounds with both bilingual tautological compounds and bilingual tautological first names.

The following are examples of bilingual tautological compounds in Yiddish:
  fíntster khóyshekh "very dark", literally "dark darkness", traceable back to the German word finster "dark" and the Hebrew word חושך ħōshekh "darkness".
  khameréyzļ "womanizer", literally "donkey-donkey", traceable back to the Hebrew word חמור [ħă'mōr] "donkey" and the German word Esel "donkey".

The following are examples of bilingual tautological first names (anthroponyms) in Yiddish:
  Dov-Ber, literally "bear-bear", traceable back to the Hebrew word  dov "bear" and the German word Bär "bear".
  Tsvi-Hirsh, literally "deer-deer", traceable back to the Hebrew word  tsvi "deer" and the German word Hirsch "deer".
  Ze'ev-Volf, literally "wolf-wolf", traceable back to the Hebrew word  ze'ev "wolf" and the German word Wolf "wolf".
  Arye-Leyb, literally "lion-lion", traceable back to the Hebrew word  arye "lion" and the German word Löwe "lion".

Examples occurring in English-language contexts include:
 River Avon, literally "River River", from Welsh
 the Sahara Desert, literally "the The Desert Desert", from Arabic.
 the La Brea Tar Pits, literally "the The Tar Tar Pits", from Spanish.
 the hoi polloi, literally "the the many", from Greek.
 Carmarthen Castle, may actually have "castle" in it three times

Syntactic pleonasm
Syntactic pleonasm occurs when the grammar of a language makes certain function words optional. For example, consider the following English sentences:
 "I know you're coming."
 "I know that you're coming."

In this construction, the conjunction that is optional when joining a sentence to a verb phrase with know. Both sentences are grammatically correct, but the word that is pleonastic in this case. By contrast, when a sentence is in spoken form and the verb involved is one of assertion, the use of that makes clear that the present speaker is making an indirect rather than a direct quotation, such that he is not imputing particular words to the person he describes as having made an assertion; the demonstrative adjective that also does not fit such an example. Also, some writers may use "that" for technical clarity reasons. In some languages, such as French, the word is not optional and should therefore not be considered pleonastic.

The same phenomenon occurs in Spanish with subject pronouns. Since Spanish is a null-subject language, which allows subject pronouns to be deleted when understood, the following sentences mean the same:
 ""
 ""

In this case, the pronoun  ('I') is grammatically optional; both sentences mean "I love you" (however, they may not have the same tone or intention—this depends on pragmatics rather than grammar). Such differing but syntactically equivalent constructions, in many languages, may also indicate a difference in register.

The process of deleting pronouns is called pro-dropping, and it also happens in many other languages, such as Korean, Japanese, Hungarian, Latin, Italian,  Portuguese, Swahili, Slavic languages, and the Lao language.

In contrast, formal English requires an overt subject in each clause. A sentence may not need a subject to have valid meaning, but to satisfy the syntactic requirement for an explicit subject a pleonastic (or dummy pronoun) is used; only the first sentence in the following pair is acceptable English:
 "It's raining."
  "Is raining."

In this example the pleonastic "it" fills the subject function, however, it does not contribute any meaning to the sentence. The second sentence, which omits the pleonastic it is marked as ungrammatical although no meaning is lost by the omission. Elements such as "it" or "there," serving as empty subject markers, are also called (syntactic) expletives, and also dummy pronouns. Compare:
 "There is rain."
  "Today is rain."

The pleonastic , expressing uncertainty in formal French, works as follows:
 ""('I fear it may rain.')
 ""('These ideas are harder to understand than I thought.')

The word / is translated as 'today', but originally means "on the day of today" since the now obsolete  means "today". It is considered a pleonasm.

The phrase  meaning 'What's that?' or 'What is it?', while literally, it means "What is it that it is?".

There are examples of the pleonastic, or dummy, negative in English, such as the construction, heard in the New England region of the United States, in which the phrase "So don't I" is intended to have the same positive meaning as "So do I."

When Robert South said, "It is a pleonasm, a figure usual in Scripture, by a multiplicity of expressions to signify one notable thing", he was observing the Biblical Hebrew poetic propensity to repeat thoughts in different words, since written Biblical Hebrew was a comparatively early form of written language and was written using oral patterning, which has many pleonasms. In particular, very many verses of the Psalms are split into two halves, each of which says much the same thing in different words. The complex rules and forms of written language as distinct from spoken language were not as well-developed as they are today when the books making up the Old Testament were written. See also parallelism (rhetoric).

This same pleonastic style remains very common in modern poetry and songwriting (e.g., "Anne, with her father / is out in the boat / riding the water / riding the waves / on the sea", from Peter Gabriel's "Mercy Street").

Types of syntactic pleonasm
 Overinflection: Many languages with inflection, as a result of convention, tend to inflect more words in a given phrase than actually needed in order to express a single grammatical property. Take for example the German, Die alten Frauen sprechen ("The old women speak"). Even though the use of the plural form of the noun Frau ("woman", plural Frauen) shows the grammatical number of the noun phrase, agreement in the German language still dictates that the definite article die, attributive adjective alten, and the verb sprechen must all also be in the plural. Not all languages are quite as redundant however, and will permit inflection for number when there is an obvious numerical marker, as is the case with Hungarian, which does have a plural proper, but would express two flowers as two flower. (The same is the case in Celtic languages, where numerical markers precede singular nouns.) The main contrast between Hungarian and other tongues such as German or even English (to a lesser extent) is that in either of the latter, expressing plurality when already evident is not optional, but mandatory; making the neglect of these rules result in an ungrammatical sentence. As well as for number, our aforementioned German phrase also overinflects for grammatical case.
 Multiple negation: In some languages, repeated negation may be used for emphasis, as in the English sentence, "There ain't nothing wrong with that". While a literal interpretation of this sentence would be "There is not nothing wrong with that," i.e. "There is something wrong with that," the intended meaning is, in fact, the opposite: "There is nothing wrong with that" or "There isn't anything wrong with that." The repeated negation is used pleonastically for emphasis. However, this is not always the case. In the sentence "I don't not like it," the repeated negative may be used to convey ambivalence ("I neither like nor dislike it") or even affirmation ("I do like it"). (Rhetorically, this becomes the device of litotes; it can be difficult to distinguish litotes from pleonastic double negation, a feature which may be used for ironic effect.) Although the use of "double negatives" for emphatic purposes is sometimes discouraged in standard English, it is mandatory in other languages like Spanish or French. For example, the Spanish phrase  ('It is nothing') contains both a negated verb ("no es") and another negative, the word for nothing ("nada").
 Multiple affirmations: In English, repeated affirmation can be used to add emphasis to an affirmative statement, just as repeated negation can add emphasis to a negative one. A sentence like I do love you, with a stronger intonation on the do, uses double affirmation. This is because English, by default, automatically expresses its sentences in the affirmative and must then alter the sentence in one way or another to express the opposite. Therefore, the sentence I love you is already affirmative, and adding the extra do only adds emphasis and does not change the meaning of the statement.
 Double possession: The double genitive of English, as with a friend of mine, is seemingly pleonastic, and therefore has been stigmatized, but it has a long history of use by careful writers and has been analyzed as either a partitive genitive or an appositive genitive.
 Multiple quality gradation: In English, different degrees of comparison (comparatives and superlatives) are created through a morphological change to an adjective (e.g. "prettier", "fastest") or a syntactic construction (e.g. "more complex", "most impressive"). It is thus possible to combine both forms for additional emphasis: "more bigger" or "bestest". This may be considered ungrammatical, but is common in informal speech for some English speakers. "The most unkindest cut of all" is from Shakespeare's Julius Caesar. Musical notation has a repeated Italian superlative in fortississimo and pianississimo.

Not all uses of constructions such as "more bigger" are pleonastic, however. Some speakers who use such utterances do so in an attempt, albeit a grammatically unconventional one, to create a non-pleonastic construction: A person who says "X is more bigger than Y" may, in the context of a conversation featuring a previous comparison of some object Z with Y, mean "The degree by which X exceeds Y in size is greater than the degree by which Z exceeds Y in size". This usage amounts to the treatment of "bigger than Y" as a single grammatical unit, namely an adjective itself admitting of degrees, such that "X is more bigger than Y" is equivalent to "X is more bigger-than-Y than Z is." Another common way to express this is: "X is even bigger than Z."

Semantic pleonasm
Semantic pleonasm is a question more of style and usage than of grammar. Linguists usually call this redundancy to avoid confusion with syntactic pleonasm, a more important phenomenon for theoretical linguistics. It usually takes one of two forms: Overlap or prolixity.

Overlap: One word's semantic component is subsumed by the other:
 "Receive a free gift with every purchase.", a gift is already free.
 "I ate a tuna fish sandwich."
 "The plumber fixed our hot water heater." (This pleonasm was famously attacked by American comedian George Carlin, but is not truly redundant; a device that increases the temperature of cold water to room temperature would also be a water heater.)
 The Big Friendly Giant (title of a children's book by Roald Dahl), a giant is inherently already big

Prolixity: A phrase may have words which add nothing, or nothing logical or relevant, to the meaning.
 "I'm going down south."(South is not really "down", it is just drawn that way on maps by convention.)
 "You can't seem to face up to the facts."
 "He entered into the room."
 "Every mother's child" (as in 'The Christmas Song' by Nat King Cole', also known as 'Chestnuts roasting...'). (Being a child, or a human at all, generally implies being the child of/to a mother. So the redundancy here is used to broaden the context of the child's curiosity regarding the sleigh of Santa Claus, including the concept of maternity. The full line goes: "And every mother's child is gonna spy, to see if reindeer really know how to fly". One can furthermore argue that the word "mother" is included for the purpose of lyrical flow, adding two syllables, which make the line sound complete, as "every child" would be too short to fit the lyrical/rhyme scheme. )
 "What therefore God hath joined together, let no man put asunder."
 "He raised up his hands in a gesture of surrender."
 "Where are you at?"
 "Located" or similar before a preposition: "the store is located on Main St." The preposition contains the idea of locatedness and does not need a servant.
 "The house itself" for "the house", and similar: unnecessary re-specifiers.
 "Actual fact": fact.
 "On a daily basis": daily.
 "This particular item": this item.
 "Different" or "separate" after numbers: for example:
 "Four different species" are merely "four species", as two non-different species are together one same species. (However, in "a discount if you buy ten different items", "different" has meaning, because if the ten items include two packets of frozen peas of the same weight and brand, those ten items are not all different.)
 "Nine separate cars": cars are always separate.
 "Despite the fact that": although.

An expression like "tuna fish", however, might elicit one of many possible responses, such as:
 It will simply be accepted as synonymous with "tuna".
 It will be perceived as redundant (and thus perhaps silly, illogical, ignorant, inefficient, dialectal, odd, and/or intentionally humorous).
 It will imply a distinction. A reader of "tuna fish" could properly wonder: "Is there a kind of tuna which is not a fish? There is, after all, a dolphin mammal and a dolphin fish." This assumption turns out to be correct, as a "tuna" can also mean a prickly pear. Further, "tuna fish" is sometimes used to refer to the flesh of the animal as opposed to the animal itself (similar to the distinction between beef and cattle).
 It will be perceived as a verbal clarification, since the word "tuna" is quite short, and may, for example, be misheard as "tune" followed by an aspiration, or (in dialects that drop the final -r sound) as "tuner".

Careful speakers, and writers, too, are aware of pleonasms, especially with cases such as "tuna fish", which is normally used only in some dialects of American English, and would sound strange in other variants of the language, and even odder in translation into other languages.

Similar situations are:
 "Ink pen" instead of merely "pen" in the southern United States, where "pen" and "pin" are pronounced similarly.
 "Extra accessories" which must be ordered separately for a new camera, as distinct from the accessories provided with the camera as sold.

Not all constructions that are typically pleonasms are so in all cases, nor are all constructions derived from pleonasms themselves pleonastic:
 "Put that glass over there on the table." This could, depending on room layout, mean "Put that glass on the table across the room, not the table right in front of you"; if the room were laid out like that, most English speakers would intuitively understand that the distant, not immediate table was the one being referred to; however, if there were only one table in the room, the phrase would indeed be pleonastic. Also, it could mean, "Put that glass on the spot (on the table) which I am gesturing to"; thus, in this case, it is not pleonastic.
 "I'm going way down South." This may imply "I'm going much farther south than you might think if I didn't stress the southerliness of my destination"; but such phrasing is also sometimes—and sometimes jokingly—used pleonastically when simply "south" would do; it depends upon the context, the intent of the speaker/writer, and ultimately even on the expectations of the listener/reader.

Morphemic pleonasm

Morphemes, not just words, can enter the realm of pleonasm: Some word-parts are simply optional in various languages and dialects. A familiar example to American English speakers would be the allegedly optional "-al-", probably most commonly seen in "" vs. "publicly"—both spellings are considered correct/acceptable in American English, and both pronounced the same, in this dialect, rendering the "publically" spelling pleonastic in US English; in other dialects it is "required", while it is quite conceivable that in another generation or so of American English it will be "forbidden". This treatment of words ending in "-ic", "-ac", etc., is quite inconsistent in US English—compare "maniacally" or "forensically" with "stoicly" or "heroicly"; "forensicly" doesn't look "right" in any dialect, but "heroically" looks internally redundant to many Americans. (Likewise, there are thousands of mostly American Google search results for "eroticly", some in reputable publications, but it does not even appear in the 23-volume, 23,000-page, 500,000-definition Oxford English Dictionary (OED), the largest in the world; and even American dictionaries give the correct spelling as "erotically".) In a more modern pair of words, Institute of Electrical and Electronics Engineers dictionaries say that "electric" and "electrical" mean the same thing. However, the usual adverb form is "electrically". (For example, "The glass rod is electrically charged by rubbing it with silk".)

Some (mostly US-based) prescriptive grammar pundits would say that the "-ly" not "-ally" form is "correct" in any case in which there is no "-ical" variant of the basic word, and vice versa; i.e. "maniacally", not "maniacly", is correct because "maniacal" is a word, while "publicly", not "publically", must be correct because "publical" is (arguably) not a real word (it does not appear in the OED). This logic is in doubt, since most if not all "-ical" constructions arguably are "real" words and most have certainly occurred more than once in "reputable" publications, and are also immediately understood by any educated reader of English even if they "look funny" to some, or do not appear in popular dictionaries. Additionally, there are numerous examples of words that have very widely accepted extended forms that have skipped one or more intermediary forms, e.g. "disestablishmentarian" in the absence of "disestablishmentary" (which does not appear in the OED). At any rate, while some US editors might consider "-ally" vs. "-ly" to be pleonastic in some cases, the majority of other English speakers would not, and many "-ally" words are not pleonastic to anyone, even in American English.

The most common definitely pleonastic morphological usage in English is "irregardless", which is very widely criticized as being a non-word. The standard usage is "regardless", which is already negative; adding the additional negative ir- is interpreted by some as logically reversing the meaning to "with regard to/for", which is certainly not what the speaker intended to convey. (According to most dictionaries that include it, "irregardless" appears to derive from confusion between "regardless" and "irrespective", which have overlapping meanings.)

Morphemic pleonasm in Modern Standard Chinese
There are several instances in Chinese vocabulary where pleonasms and cognate objects are present. Their presence usually indicate the plural form of the noun or the noun in formal context.
  ('book(s)' – in general)
  ('paper, tissue, pieces of paper' – formal)

In some instances, the pleonasmic form of the verb is used with the intention as an emphasis to one meaning of the verb, isolating them from their idiomatic and figurative uses. But over time, the pseudo-object, which sometimes repeats the verb, is almost inherently coupled with the it.

For example, the word  ('to sleep') is an intransitive verb, but may express different meaning when coupled with objects of prepositions as in "to sleep with". However, in Mandarin,  is usually coupled with a pseudo-character , yet it is not entirely a cognate object, to express the act of resting.
  ('I want sleep').
In this context,  ('to sleep') is a complete verb and native speakers often express themselves this way. Adding this particle clears any suspicion from using it with any direct object shown in the next example:
When the verb follows an animate direct object  the meaning changes dramatically. The first instance is mainly seen in colloquial speech.

One can also find a way around this verb, using another one which does not is used to express idiomatic expressions nor necessitate a pleonasm, because it only has one meaning:
  ('I want "to dorm)
Nevertheless,  is a verb used in high-register diction, just like English verbs with Latin roots.

There is no relationship found between Chinese and English regarding verbs that can take pleonasms and cognate objects. Although the verb to sleep may take a cognate object as in "sleep a restful sleep", it is a pure coincidence, since verbs of this form are more common in Chinese than in English; and when the English verb is used without the cognate objects, its diction is natural and its meaning is clear in every level of diction, as in "I want to sleep" and "I want to have a rest".

Subtler redundancies
In some cases, the redundancy in meaning occurs at the syntactic level above the word, such as at the phrase level:

 "It's déjà vu all over again."
 "I never make predictions, especially about the future."

The redundancy of these two well-known statements is deliberate, for humorous effect. (See Yogi Berra#"Yogi-isms".) But one does hear educated people say "my predictions about the future of politics" for "my predictions about politics", which are equivalent in meaning. While predictions are necessarily about the future (at least in relation to the time the prediction was made), the nature of this future can be subtle (e.g., "I predict that he died a week ago"—the prediction is about future discovery or proof of the date of death, not about the death itself). Generally "the future" is assumed, making most constructions of this sort pleonastic. The latter humorous quote above about not making predictions – by Yogi Berra – is not really a pleonasm, but rather an ironic play on words.
Alternatively it could be an analogy between predict and guess.

However, "It's déjà vu all over again" could mean that there was earlier another déjà vu of the same event or idea, which has now arisen for a third time; or that the speaker had very recently experienced a déjà vu of a different idea.

Redundancy, and "useless" or "nonsensical" words (or phrases, or morphemes), can also be inherited by one language from the influence of another and are not pleonasms in the more critical sense but actual changes in grammatical construction considered to be required for "proper" usage in the language or dialect in question. Irish English, for example, is prone to a number of constructions that non-Irish speakers find strange and sometimes directly confusing or silly:
 "I'm after putting it on the table."('I [have] put it on the table.') This example further shows that the effect, whether pleonastic or only pseudo-pleonastic, can apply to words and word-parts, and multi-word phrases, given that the fullest rendition would be "I am after putting it on the table".
 "Have a look at your man there."('Have a look at that man there.') An example of word substitution, rather than addition, that seems illogical outside the dialect. This common possessive-seeming construction often confuses the non-Irish enough that they do not at first understand what is meant. Even "Have a look at that man there" is arguably further doubly redundant, in that a shorter "Look at that man" version would convey essentially the same meaning.
 "She's my wife so she is."('She's my wife.') Duplicate subject and verb, post-complement, used to emphasize a simple factual statement or assertion.

All of these constructions originate from the application of Irish Gaelic grammatical rules to the English dialect spoken, in varying particular forms, throughout the island.

Seemingly "useless" additions and substitutions must be contrasted with similar constructions that are used for stress, humor, or other intentional purposes, such as:
 "I abso-fuckin'-lutely agree!"(tmesis, for stress)
 "Topless-shmopless—nudity doesn't distract me."(shm-reduplication, for humor)

The latter of these is a result of Yiddish influences on modern English, especially East Coast US English.

Sometimes editors and grammatical stylists will use "pleonasm" to describe simple wordiness. This phenomenon is also called prolixity or logorrhea. Compare:
 "The sound of the loud music drowned out the sound of the burglary."
 "The loud music drowned out the sound of the burglary."
or even:
 "The music drowned out the burglary."

The reader or hearer does not have to be told that loud music has a sound, and in a newspaper headline or other abbreviated prose can even be counted upon to infer that "burglary" is a proxy for "sound of the burglary" and that the music necessarily must have been loud to drown it out, unless the burglary was relatively quiet (this is not a trivial issue, as it may affect the legal culpability of the person who played the music); the word "loud" may imply that the music should have been played quietly if at all. Many are critical of the excessively abbreviated constructions of "headline-itis" or "newsspeak", so "loud [music]" and "sound of the [burglary]" in the above example should probably not be properly regarded as pleonastic or otherwise genuinely redundant, but simply as informative and clarifying.

Prolixity is also used to obfuscate, confuse, or euphemize and is not necessarily redundant or pleonastic in such constructions, though it often is. "Post-traumatic stress disorder" (shell shock) and "pre-owned vehicle" (used car) are both tumid euphemisms but are not redundant. Redundant forms, however, are especially common in business, political, and academic language that is intended to sound impressive (or to be vague so as to make it hard to determine what is actually being promised, or otherwise misleading). For example: "This quarter, we are presently focusing with determination on an all-new, innovative integrated methodology and framework for rapid expansion of customer-oriented external programs designed and developed to bring the company's consumer-first paradigm into the marketplace as quickly as possible."

In contrast to redundancy, an oxymoron results when two seemingly contradictory words are adjoined.

Foreign words

Redundancies sometimes take the form of foreign words whose meaning is repeated in the context:
 "We went to the El Restaurante restaurant."
 "The La Brea tar pits are fascinating."
 "Roast beef served with au jus sauce."
 "Please R.S.V.P."
 "The Schwarzwald Forest is deep and dark."
 "The Drakensberg Mountains are in South Africa."
 LibreOffice office suite.
 The hoi polloi.
 I'd like to have a chai tea.

These sentences use phrases which mean, respectively, "the  restaurant restaurant", "the  tar tar", "with  juice sauce" and so on. However, many times these redundancies are necessary—especially when the foreign words make up a proper noun as opposed to a common one. For example, "We went to Il Ristorante" is acceptable provided the audience can infer that it is a restaurant. (If they understand Italian and English it might, if spoken, be misinterpreted as a generic reference and not a proper noun, leading the hearer to ask "Which ristorante do you mean?"—such confusions are common in richly bilingual areas like Montreal or the American Southwest when mixing phrases from two languages.) But avoiding the redundancy of the Spanish phrase in the second example would only leave an awkward alternative: "La Brea pits are fascinating".

Most find it best to not even drop articles when using proper nouns made from foreign languages:
 "The movie is playing at the El Capitan theater."

This is also similar to the treatment of definite and indefinite articles in titles of books, films, etc. where the article can—some would say must—be present where it would otherwise be "forbidden":
 "Stephen King's The Shining is scary."(Normally, the article would be left off following a possessive.)
 "I'm having an An American Werewolf in London movie night at my place."(Seemingly doubled article, which would be taken for a stutter or typographical error in other contexts.)

Some cross-linguistic redundancies, especially in placenames, occur because a word in one language became the title of a place in another (e.g., the Sahara Desert—"Sahara" is an English approximation of the word for "deserts" in Arabic). "The Los Angeles Angels" professional baseball team is literally "the The Angels Angels." A supposed extreme example is Torpenhow Hill in Cumbria, where some of the elements in the name likely mean "hill". See the List of tautological place names for many more examples.

Acronyms and initialisms

Acronyms and initialisms can also form the basis for redundancies; this is known humorously as RAS syndrome (for Redundant Acronym Syndrome syndrome). In all the examples that follow, the word after the acronym repeats a word represented in the acronym. The full redundant phrase is stated in the parentheses that follow each example:
 "I forgot my PIN number for the ATM machine." (Personal Identification Number number; Automated Teller Machine machine)
 "I upgraded the RAM memory of my computer." (Random Access Memory memory)
 "She is infected with the HIV virus." (Human Immunodeficiency Virus virus)
 "I have installed a CMS system on my server." (Content Management System system)
 "The SI system of units is the modern form of the metric system." (International System system)

(See RAS syndrome for many more examples.) The expansion of an acronym like PIN or HIV may be well known to English speakers, but the acronyms themselves have come to be treated as words, so little thought is given to what their expansion is (and "PIN" is also pronounced the same as the word "pin"; disambiguation is probably the source of "PIN number"; "SIN number" for "Social Insurance Number number"  is a similar common phrase in Canada.) But redundant acronyms are more common with technical (e.g. computer) terms where well-informed speakers recognize the redundancy and consider it silly or ignorant, but mainstream users might not, since they may not be aware or certain of the full expansion of an acronym like "RAM".

Typographical

Some redundancies are simply typographical. For instance, when a short inflexional word like "the" occurs at the end of a line, it is very common to accidentally repeat it at the beginning of the following line, and a large number of readers would not even notice it.

Apparent redunancies that actually are not redundant

Carefully constructed expressions, especially in poetry and political language, but also some general usages in everyday speech, may appear to be redundant but are not. This is most common with cognate objects (a verb's object that is cognate with the verb):
 "She slept a deep sleep."

Or, a classic example from Latin:
 mutatis mutandis = "with change made to what needs to be changed" (an ablative absolute construction)

The words need not be etymologically related, but simply conceptually, to be considered an example of cognate object:
 "We wept tears of joy."

Such constructions are not actually redundant (unlike "She slept a sleep" or "We wept tears") because the object's modifiers provide additional information. A rarer, more constructed form is polyptoton, the stylistic repetition of the same word or words derived from the same root:
 "...[T]he only thing we have to fear is fear itself."—Franklin D. Roosevelt, "First Inaugural Address", March 1933.
 "With eager feeding[,] food doth choke the feeder."—William Shakespeare, Richard II, II, i, 37.

As with cognate objects, these constructions are not redundant because the repeated words or derivatives cannot be removed without removing meaning or even destroying the sentence, though in most cases they could be replaced with non-related synonyms at the cost of style (e.g., compare "The only thing we have to fear is terror".)

Semantic pleonasm and context
In many cases of semantic pleonasm, the status of a word as pleonastic depends on context. The relevant context can be as local as a neighboring word, or as global as the extent of a speaker's knowledge. In fact, many examples of redundant expressions are not inherently redundant, but can be redundant if used one way, and are not redundant if used another way. The "up" in "climb up" is not always redundant, as in the example "He climbed up and then fell down the mountain." Many other examples of pleonasm are redundant only if the speaker's knowledge is taken into account. For example, most English speakers would agree that "tuna fish" is redundant because tuna is a kind of fish. However, given the knowledge that "tuna" can also refer to a kind of edible prickly pear, the "fish" in "tuna fish" can be seen as non-pleonastic, but rather a disambiguator between the fish and the prickly pear.

Conversely, to English speakers who do not know Spanish, there is nothing redundant about "the La Brea tar pits" because the name "La Brea" is opaque: the speaker does not know that it is Spanish for "the tar" and thus "the La Brea Tar Pits" translates to "the the tar tar pits". Similarly, even though scuba stands for "self-contained underwater breathing apparatus", a phrase like "the scuba gear" would probably not be considered pleonastic because "scuba" has been reanalyzed into English as a simple word, and not an acronym suggesting the pleonastic word sequence "apparatus gear". (Most do not even know that it is an acronym and do not spell it SCUBA or S.C.U.B.A. Similar examples are radar and laser.)

See also

Notes

References

Citations

Bibliography

External links
 

Figures of speech
Linguistics
Rhetoric
Semantics
Syntax